Pakistan has, over its 60-year history, issued over 600 issues and 1,100 stamps and souvenir sheets.

 1947 to 1966
 1967 to 1976
 1977 to 1986
 1987 to 1996
 1997 to 2006
 2007 to 2016
 2017 to present

1977
 1977 –1 Social Welfare & Rural Development Year – 14 April 1977
  One stamp was issued on this occasion 
  Value:  20 p

 1977 –2 13th Anniversary of R.C.D.– 21 July 1977
  Three stamps were issued on this occasion 
  Value:  20 p, 65 p, 90 p

 1977 –3 National Tree Plantation Campaign – 9 August 1977
  One stamp was issued on this occasion 
  Value:  20 p

 1977 –4 U.N. Conference of Desertification – 5 September 1977
  One stamp was issued on this occasion 
  Value:  65 p

 1977 –5 Universal Children's Day– 3 October 1977
  One stamp was issued on this occasion 
  Value:  50 p

 1977 –6 Birth Centenary of Agha Khan III – 2 November 1977
  One stamp was issued on this occasion 
  Value:  Rs. 2

 1977 –7 Iqbal Centenary 1977 – 9 November 1977
  Five stamps were issued in se-tenant horizontal strip on this occasion 
  Value:  20 p, 65 p, Rs. 1.25, Rs. 2.25 Rs. 3

 1977 –8 Hajj 1977/1397 A.H. – 21 November 1977
  One stamp was issued on this occasion 
  Value:  65 p

 1977 –9 World Rheumatism Year – 19 December 1977
  One stamp was issued on this occasion 
  Value:  65 p

1978
 1978 –1 IPECC Commemoration – 9 February 1978
  One stamp was issued on this occasion 
  Value:  75 p

 1978 –2 World Hypertension Month – 20 April 1978
  Two stamps were issued on this occasion 
  Value:  20 p, Rs. 2

 1978 –3 Henry Dunant Commemoration – 8 May 1978
  One stamp was issued on this occasion 
  Value:  Rs. 1

 1978 –4 14th Anniversary of R.C.D. – 21 July 1978
  Three stamps were issued in horizontal strip on this occasion
  Joint issue with Iran & Turkey 
  Value:  20 p, 90 p, Rs. 2

 1978 –5 30th Anniversary of Riccione – 26 August 1978
  Two stamps were issued on this occasion 
  Value:  Rs. 1, Rs. 2

 1978 –6UN Conference on Technical Co-Operation Amongst Developing Countries–3 September 1978
  One stamp was issued on this occasion 
  Value:  75 p

 1978 –7 Centenary of St. Patrick's Cathedral, Karachi – 29 September 1978
  Two stamps were issued on this occasion 
  Value:  Rs. 1, Rs. 2

 1978-80 –8 Definitive Series
  Eighteen Definitive stamps were issued on this occasion 
  These stamps were issued in two different gums, Arabic Gum and P.V.A. Gum
  Collectors collect these stamps in both gums
  Value:  Minar-e-Pakistan 2 p, 3 p, 5 p 
          Tractor 10 p, 20 p, 25 p, 40 p, 50 p, 60 p, 75 p Die I, 75 Die II. 90 p
          Makli Tomb Rs. 1, Rs. 1.50, Rs. 2, Rs. 3, Rs. 4, Rs. 5 
 
 1978 –9 International Apartheid Year – 20 November 1978
  One stamp was issued on this occasion 
  Value:  Rs. 1

 1978 –10 Birth Centenary of Maulana Muhammad Ali Jauhar– 10 December 1978
  One stamp was issued on this occasion 
  Value:  50 p

 1978 –11 75th Anniversary of First Power Flight – 24 December 1978
  Four stamps were issued on this occasion 
  Value:  65p, Rs. 1, Rs. 2, Rs. 2.25

1979
 1979 –1 12th Rabi-ul-Awal 1399 A.H, Commemoration – 10 February 1979
  One stamp was issued on this occasion 
  Value:  20 p

 1979 –2 30 years of APWA– 25 February 1979
  One stamp was issued on this occasion 
  Value:  50 p

 1979 –3 Pioneers of Freedom – 23 March 1979
  Three stamps were issued on this occasion
  These stamps were printed in horizontal se-tanent strip of three stamps throughout the sheet.
  Later on separate sheets of each value were issued
  Value:  Rs. 10, Rs. 15, Rs. 25

 1979 –4 Wildlife Series – 17 June 1979
  Four stamps were issued on this occasion
  Value:  20p, 25p, 40p, Rs. 1

 1979 –5 15th Anniversary of R.C.D. – 21 July 1979
  Three stamps were issued on this occasion
  These stamps were printed in vertical se-tanent strip of three stamps throughout the sheet. 
  Value:  40p, 75p, Rs. 1.60

 1979 –6 Pakistan Handicraft Series – 23 August 1979
  Four stamps were issued on this occasion
  These stamps were printed in se-tanent Block of Four stamps throughout the sheet. 
  Value:  40p, Rs. 1, Rs. 1.5, Rs. 2

 1979 –7 International Children Year – 22 October 1979
  One stamp was issued on this occasion 
  Value:  50 p

 1979 –8 SOS Children's Villages – 10 September 1979
  Four stamps and one Souvenir sheet were issued on this occasion
  These stamps were printed in se-tanent Block of Four stamps throughout the sheet. 
  Value:  40p, 75p, Rs. 1, Rs. 1.50 Souvenir Sheet Rs. 2

 1979 –9 Fight against cancer – 12 November 1979
  One stamp was issued on this occasion 
  Value:  40 p

 1979 –10 Custom Centenary – 10 December 1979
  One stamp was issued on this occasion 
  Value:  Rs. 1

1980
 1980 –1 25 Years of PIA Services – 10 January 1980
  One stamp was issued on this occasion 
  Value:  Rs. 1

 1980 –2 Special Regular Series 12 January –13 March 1980
  Seven stamp were issued on this occasion.
  These stamps were printed at Secura Press, Singapore 
  Value:  10p, 15p, 25p, 35p, 40p, 50p, 80p

 1980 –3 Fifth Asian Congress of Paediatric Surgery Karachi – 16 February 1980
  One stamp was issued on this occasion 
  Value:  50p

 1980 –4 11th Islamic Conference of Foreign Ministers, Islamabad – 17 May 1980
  One stamp was issued on this occasion 
  Value:  Rs. 1

 1980 –5 100 Years of Karachi Port Management – 15 July 1980
  One stamp was issued on this occasion 
  Value:  Rs. 1

 1980 –6 Riccione – 30 August 1980
  Four stamps were issued on this occasion
  These stamps were printed in se-tanent Block of Four throughout the sheet. 
  Value:  40p, 75p, Rs. 1, Rs. 1.50

 1980 –7 75 Years of Command and Staff College, Quetta – 18 September 1980
  One stamp was issued on this occasion 
  Value:  Rs. 1

 1980 –8 World Tourism Conference – 27 September 1980
  One stamp was Overprinted as "World Tourism Conference Manila 80" on this occasion 
  Value:  Rs. 1

 1980 –9 Birth Centenary of Hafiz Mahmood Shairani – 5 October 1980
  One stamp was issued on this occasion 
  Value:  40p

 1980 –10 The Agha Khan Award for Architecture – 23 October 1980
  One stamp was issued on this occasion 
  Value:  Rs. 2

 1980 –11 1400th Anniversary of Hijra – 10 November 1980
  Three stamps and one Souvenir sheet were issued on this occasion
  Value:  40p, Rs. 2, Rs. 3 Souvenir Sheet Rs. 4

 1980 –12 100 Years of Money Order Service – 20 December 1980
  One stamp was issued on this occasion 
  Value:  40p

 1980 –13 100 Years of Postcard Service – 27 December 1980
  One stamp was issued on this occasion 
  Value:  40p

1981
 1981 –1 150th Birth Anniversary of Heinrich von Stephen– 7 January 1981
  One stamp was issued on this occasion 
  Value:  Rs. 1

 1981 –2 50 Years of Air Mail Service – 15 February 1981
  One stamp was issued on this occasion 
  Value:  Rs. 1

 1981 –3 1400th Anniversary of Hijra– 7 March 1981
  One stamp was issued on this occasion 
  Value:  40p

 1981 –4 Third Islamic Summit Conference at Makkah (First Series) – 29 March 1981
  Five stamps were issued on this occasion 
  Value:  40p, 40p, Rs. 1, Rs. 1, Rs. 2

 1981 –5 Third Islamic Summit Conference at Makkah (Second Series) – 20 April 1981
  Four stamps were issued on this occasion 
  Value:  40p, 40p, 85p, 85p

 1981 –6 Birth Centenary of Mustafa Kemal Atatürk– 19 May 1981
  One stamp was issued on this occasion 
  Value:  Rs. 1

 1981 –7 Wildlife Series – 20 June 1981
  One stamp was issued on this occasion 
  Value:  40p

 1981 –8 Palestine – 25 July 1981
  One stamp was issued on this occasion 
  Value:  Rs. 2

 1981 –9 Mountain Peaks of Pakistan – 20 August 1981
  Eight stamps were issued on this occasion 
  Value:  40p, 40p, Rs. 1, Rs. 1, Rs. 1.50, Rs. 1.50, Rs. 2, Rs. 2

 1981 –10 Inauguration Furnace no 1 Pakistan Steel Mills – 31 August 1981
  Two stamps were issued on this occasion 
  Value:  40p, Rs. 2

 1981 –11 Wildlife Series – 15 September 1981
  Two stamps were issued on this occasion 
  Value:  40p, Rs. 2

 1981 –12 International Year of Disabled Persons – 12 December 1981
  Two stamps were issued on this occasion 
  Value:  40p, Rs. 2

1982
 1982 –1 World Hockey Champions– 31 January 1982
  Two stamps were issued on this occasion
  These stamps were issued in gutter sheets with five gutter. 
  In three gutter Hockey World Cup is shown in Blue, Black and Red colours 
  while two gutters are blank. 
  Value:  Rs. 1, Rs. 1

 1982 –2 Handicraft Series – 20 February 1982
  Two stamps were issued on this occasion
  Value:  Rs. 1, Rs. 1

 1982 –3 T.B. Bacillus Century – 24 March 1982
  One stamp was issued on this occasion 
  Value:  Rs. 1

 1982 –4 Indus Dolphins – 24 April 1982
  Two stamps were issued on this occasion
  Value: 40p, Rs. 1

 1982 –5 Space Exploration – 7 June 1982
  One stamp was issued on this occasion 
  These stamps were issued in gutter sheets with Eight gutters 
  in different Blue colour pictures.
  Value:  Rs. 1

 1982 6 Sukkur Barrage Golden Jubilee – 17 July 1982
  One stamp was issued on this occasion 
  Value:  Rs. 1

 1982 –7 Independence Day Commemoration – 14 August 1982
  Two stamps were issued on this occasion
  Value:  40p, 85p

 1982 –8 Riccione – 28 August 1982
  One stamp was issued on this occasion
  These stamps were issued to commemorate Riccione-Stamps Exhibition
  The world "RICCIONE 82" were overprinted on sukkur Barrage Stamps 
  Value:  Rs. 1

 1982 –9 100 Years of the University of Punjab – 14 October 1982
  One stamp was issued on this occasion 
  These stamps were issued in gutter sheets with Eleven gutters 
  in different purple colour pictures, Five emblems and six pictures of university buildings.
  Value:  Rs. 1

 1982 –10 75th Anniversary of the Scout Movement– 23 December 1982
  One stamp was issued on this occasion 
  Value:  Rs. 2

1983
 1983 –1 Inauguration of Quetta Natural Gas Pipeline Project – 6 January 1983
  One stamp was issued on this occasion 
  Value:  Rs. 2

 1983 –2 Wildlife 9th Series (Butterflies) – 15 February 1983
  Four stamps were issued on this occasion 
  These stamps were issued in gutter sheets with Five gutters 
  Value:  Rs. 40p, 50p, 60p, Rs. 1.50

 1983 –3 Pakistan Handicraft Series – 9 March 1983
  Two stamps were issued on this occasion
  Value:  Rs. 1, Rs. 1

 1983 –4 Aga Khan University – 16 March 1983
  One stamp was issued on this occasion
  These stamps were issued in gutter sheet Lets with Four gutters 
  Value:  Rs. 2
 
 1983 5 Trekking in Pakistan – 28 April 1983
  One stamp was issued on this occasion 
  Value:  Rs. 1

 1983 –6 Wildlife Series -Marsh Crocodile – 19 May 1983
  One stamp was issued on this occasion
  These stamps were issued in gutter sheets with Five gutters 
  Value:  Rs. 3

 1983 –7 Wildlife Series Chinkara – 20 June 1983
  One stamp was issued on this occasion 
  Value:  Rs. 1

 1983 –8 Independence Day – 14 August 1983
  Two stamps were issued on this occasion
  Value:  60p, Rs. 4

 1983 –9 Indonesia Pakistan Economic & Cultural Cooperation – 19 August 1983
  Two stamps were issued on this occasion
  Indonesia also issued stamps on this occasion
  Value:  Rs. 2, Rs. 2

 1983 –10 Wildlife Series – Siberian Cranes 20 September 1983
  One stamp was issued on this occasion 
  Value:  Rs. 3

 1983 –11 World Communication Year – 9 October 1983
  Two stamps were issued on this occasion
  Value:  Rs. 2, Rs. 3

 1983 –12 World Food Day – 24 October 1983
  Four stamps in sheetlets were issued on this occasion
  12 stamps were issued in three horizontal se-tanent strips of four stamps. 
  Value:  Rs. 3, Rs. 3, Rs. 3, Rs. 3

 1983 –13 National Fertilizer Corporation – 24 October 1983
  One stamp was issued on this occasion 
  Value:  60p

 1983 –14 World Communication Year 1983,
  National Stamp Exhibition – Pakphilex 1983–13 November 1983
  Six stamps in sheetlets were issued on this occasion
  12 stamps were issued in Two horizontal se-tanent strips of Six stamps. 
  Value:  60p, 60p, 60p, 60p, 60p, 60p,

 1983 –15 Yachting Champions – 31 December 1983
  Two stamps were issued on this occasion
  Value:  60p, 60p

1984
 1984 – 1 Wildlife Series (Snow Leopard)– 21 January 1984
  Two stamps were issued on this occasion
  Value:  40p, Rs. 1.60

 1984 – 2 Squash – 17 March 1984
  One stamp was issued on this occasion 
  Value:  Rs. 3

 1984 – 3 20 years of PIA China Service – 29 April 1984
  One stamp was issued on this occasion 
  Value:  Rs. 3

 1984 – 4 Pakistan Handicraft Series – 31 May 1984
  Four stamps were issued on this occasion
  Value:  Rs. 1, Rs. 1, Rs. 1, Rs. 1

 1984 – 5 Definitive "Forts" Series
  Eight Definitive stamps were issued on this occasion
  Value:  5p, 10p, 15p, 20p, 50p, 60p, 70p, 80p

 1984 – 6 Aga Khan Award for Architecture – 26 June 1984
  One stamp was issued on this occasion 
  Value:  Rs. 60p

 1984 – 7 20th Anniversary of ABU – 1 July 1984
  One stamp was issued on this occasion 
  Value:  Rs. 3

 1984 – 8 Los Angeles Olympics – 31 July 1984
  Five stamps were issued on this occasion
  Value:  Rs. 3, Rs. 3, Rs. 3, Rs. 3, Rs. 3

 1984 – 9 Independence Day – 14 August 1984
  Two stamps were issued on this occasion
  Value:  60p, Rs. 4

 1984 – 10 Pakistan International Trade Fair – 5 November 1984
  One stamp was issued on this occasion 
  Value:  60p

 1984 – 11 Pakistan Tourism Convention – 5 November 1984
  Five stamps were issued on this occasion
  Value:  Rs. 1, Rs. 1, Rs. 1, Rs. 1, Rs. 1

 1984 – 12 Silver Jubilee of U.B.L – 7 November 1984
  One stamp was issued on this occasion 
  Value:  60p

 1984 – 13 20th Anniversary of UNTAD – 24 December 1984
  One stamp was issued on this occasion 
  Value:  60p

 1984 – 14 Centenary of PLI – 29 December 1984
  Two stamps were issued on this occasion
  Value:  60p, Rs. 1

 1984 – 15 Save Mohenjadaro – 31 December 1984
  Two stamps were issued on this occasion
  Value:  Rs. 2, Rs. 2

1985
 1985 – 1 75th Year of Girl Guides Movement – 5 January 1985
  One stamp was issued on this occasion
  Value:  60p,

 1985 – 2 Inauguration of Pakistan Steel Mills – 15 January 1985
  Two stamps were issued on this occasion
  Value:  Rs. 1, Rs. 1

 1985 – 3 Referendum 1984 – 20 March 1985
  One stamp was issued on this occasion
  Value:  60p,

 1985 – 4 Election 1985 – 23 March 1985
  Two stamps were issued on this occasion
  Value:  Rs. 1, Rs. 1

 1985 – 5 Mountain Peaks of Pakistan – 27 May 1985
  Two stamps were issued on this occasion
  Value:  40p, Rs. 2

 1985 – 6 Hockey Champions – 5 July 1985
  One stamp was issued on this occasion
  Value:  Rs. 1

 1985 – 7 125th Year of King Edward Medical College, Lahore – 28 July 1985
  One stamp was issued on this occasion
  Value:  Rs. 3

 1985 – 8 Independence Day – 14 August 1985
  Two stamps were issued on this occasion
  Value:  60p, 60p

 1985 – 9 Centenary of Sind Madressah-tul-Islam, Karachi – 1 September 1985
  One stamp was issued on this occasion
  Value:  Rs. 2

 1985 – 10 Jamia Masjid Pakistan Security Printing Corporation  – 14 September 1985
  Two stamps were issued on this occasion
  Value:  Rs. 1, Rs. 1

 1985 – 11 125th Anniversary of Lawrence College, Murree – 26 September 1985
  One stamp was issued on this occasion
  Value:  Rs. 3

 1985 – 12 40th Anniversary of the United Nations – 24 October 1985
  Two stamps were issued on this occasion
  Value:  Rs. 1, Rs. 2

 1985 – 13 10th National Scout Jamboree – 8 November 1985
  One stamp was issued on this occasion
  Value:  60p,

 1985 – 14 Silver Jubilee of Islamabad – 30 November 1985
  One stamp was issued on this occasion
  Value:  Rs. 3

 1985 – 15 SAARC Commemoration – 8 December 1985
  Two stamps were issued on this occasion
  Value:  Rs. 1, Rs. 2

 1985 – 16 25th Anniversary of UN General Assembly Declaration on the Granting
  of Independence for Colonial Territories – 14 December 1985
  One stamp was issued on this occasion
  Value:  60p,

1986
 1986 –1 Wildlife Series (Shaheen Falcon) – 20 January 1986
  One stamp was issued on this occasion
  Value:  Rs. 1.50

 1986 –2 25th Anniversary of ADBP – 18 February 1986
  One stamp was issued on this occasion
  Value:  60p

 1986 –3 Centenary of S.E. College, Bhawalpur – 25 April 1986
  One stamp was issued on this occasion
  Value:  Rs. 1

 1986 –4 25th Anniversary of APO – 11 May 1986
  One stamp was issued on this occasion
  Value:  Rs. 1

 1986 –5 Independence Day – 14 August 1986
  Two stamps were issued on this occasion
  Value:  80p, Rs. 1

 1986 –6 International Literacy Day– 8 September 1986
  One stamp was issued on this occasion
  Value:  Rs. 1

 1986 –7 Child Survival and Development Revolution – 28 October 1986
  One stamp was issued on this occasion
  Value:  80p

 1986 –8 Centenary of Aitchison College – 3 November 1986
  One stamp was issued on this occasion
  Value:  Rs. 2.50

 1986 –9 International Year of Peace – 20 November 1986
  One stamp was issued on this occasion
  Value:  Rs. 4

 1986 –10 4th Asian Cup Table Tennis Tournament – 25 November 1986
  One stamp was issued on this occasion
  Value:  Rs. 2

 1986 –11 Wildlife Series – 4 December 1986
  One stamp was issued on this occasion
  Value:  Rs. 2

 1986 –12 ECOPHILEX 86 National Stamp Exhibition – 20 December 1986
  Three stamp were issued in se-tanent strip of three stamp throughout the sheet.
  Value:  Rs. 3, Rs. 3, Rs. 3

External links
"Collect Pakistan Postage Stamps" Stamps Catalogue. The First Catalogue on Pakistan Stamps 1947–2009. 1st Edition 1975. Now available on-line free of charges at  Editor Akhtar ul Islam Siddiqui, 22-J-Z Madina Town, Faisalabad Pakistan.

1977